Moshe Murro was an Israeli artist.

Biography 
Moshe Murro was born in 1888. He set up a Kamiya (Amulet) workshop, to restore old ivory or stone amulets at the Bezalel Academy of Arts and Design in Jerusalem between the 1920s–1930s. Moshe Moro died in 1957.

Artistic career
 
There are some works of Moshe Murro which have recently seen light in auction houses. An album with original photographs of more than 50 of his works, brass and bronze embossments, sculpting in ivory and stone accompanied by titles: in the Old City, Eliezer ben Yehuda, Henrietta Szold, Balfour, was recently sold. In addition other items have been up for sale.

Teaching 
 Bezalel Academy of Art, Jerusalem

External links 

 
 
 

1888 births
1957 deaths
20th-century Israeli painters